The Bangladesh Federal Union of Journalists is a national trade union federation of professional journalists in Bangladesh and is located in Dhaka, Bangladesh. It is aligned with the left wing political party, Bangladesh Awami League.

History
The Bangladesh Federal Union of Journalists was founded in 1950 as the Pakistan Federal Union of Journalists. After the independence of Bangladesh in 1971 the name was changed to Bangladesh Federal Union of Journalists. The Union has called for repeal of section 57 of the information and communication technology act of Bangladesh, which it said was being used to censor journalists. The union has 3786 members throughout Bangladesh. Manjurul Ahsan Bulbul was elected president of the union in 2017.

References

1971 establishments in Bangladesh
Journalists' trade unions
Organisations based in Dhaka
Trade unions in Bangladesh
Bangladeshi journalism organisations